Biblical antiquities may refer to:

Biblical archaeology
Biblical Antiquities of Pseudo-Philo